The 1957 All-Ireland Minor Football Championship was the 26th staging of the All-Ireland Minor Football Championship, the Gaelic Athletic Association's premier inter-county Gaelic football tournament for boys under the age of 18.

Dublin entered the championship as defending champions, however, they were defeated in the Leinster Championship.

On 22 September 1957, Meath won the championship following a 3-9 to 0-4 defeat of Armagh in the All-Ireland final. This was their first All-Ireland title.

Results

Ulster Minor Football Championship

Munster Minor Football Championship

Leinster Minor Football Championship

Connacht Minor Football Championship

Quarter-final

Mayo beat Roscommon.

Semi-finals

Mayo 5-4 Galway 1-4. 

Leitrim 1-6 Sligo 0-2. 

Final

Mayo 4-4 Leitrim 2-5 Pearse Stadium.

All-Ireland Minor Football Championship

Semi-finals

Final

Championship statistics

Miscellaneous

 Meath win the Leinster title for the first time in their history.

References

1957
All-Ireland Minor Football Championship